Episcepsis rotundipennis is a moth of the family Erebidae. It was described by Hans Zerny in 1931. It is found in Bolivia.

References

Euchromiina
Moths described in 1931